Perchlorate reductase is an enzyme that catalyzes the chemical reactions:

ClO4− + 2 AH2  ClO2− + 2 A + 2 H2O

and

ClO3− + AH2  ClO2− + A + H2O

Thus, the substrates of this enzyme are a reduced electron acceptor (denoted AH2) and either chlorate or perchlorate, sometimes collectively denoted as (per)chlorate. The products are chlorite, an oxidized electron acceptor (denoted A), and water. It is closely related to the enzyme chlorate reductase, but is distinguished by its ability to reduce both perchlorate and chlorate, whereas chlorate reductase only acts on chlorate. Perchlorate reductase and chlorate reductase are closely related but form genetically distinct clades.

As of February 2023, perchlorate reductase has not been assigned a specific Enzyme Commission number, but along with chlorate reductase, it would presumably be a member of the EC 1.97.1.- oxidoreductase subclass. Some databases, including BRENDA, currently combine perchlorate reductase and chlorate reductase listings.

Structure 

Perchlorate reductase is usually encoded as a combination of four genes, denoted pcrABCD. The active subunits are pcrA and pcrB which form a periplasmic dimer similar to the active complex in nitrate reductase. pcrC is a believed to be a c-type cytochrome that connects the AB complex to the membrane and allows for electron shuttling. The function of pcrD is uncertain, but may encode a molybdenum-containing chaperone protein specific to assembling the pcrABC system. All known functional perchlorate reductase enzymes include genetically similar versions of pcrABCD except for the Campylobacterota Arcobacter strain CAB, which lacks a traditional pcrC and appears to have replaced it with an unrelated Campylobacterota cytochrome.

All characterized organisms that encode perchlorate reductase also have the enzyme chlorite dismutase, which reduces the chlorite produced by perchlorate reductase, and prevents this reactive compound from accumulating to toxic levels. The pcrABCD and chlorite dismutase gene are typically located together in the bacterial genome.

References

Literature 
 
 

EC 1.97.1
Enzymes of known structure